Hunter: The Vigil is a tabletop role-playing game originally published by White Wolf Publishing on August 14, 2008, and is the sixth game in their game series Chronicles of Darkness – a reboot of the World of Darkness series. Led by a storyteller, players take the roles of people who have learned of the existence of the supernatural, and fight back against monsters as groups of hunters.

The game was originally designed by Justin Achilli, Rich Thomas, and Chuck Wendig, who based it on the earlier game Hunter: The Reckoning; Monica Valentinelli designed a second edition with updates to the game rules, which was released by Onyx Path Publishing in 2022. Both White Wolf Publishing and Onyx Path Publishing have supported the game with supplementary game books including adventure modules; the latter has also released the Dark Eras line of books describing the setting in other time periods. The game line was commercially successful and well received critically.

Overview
Hunter: The Vigil is a horror tabletop role-playing game with a modern-day setting. Players take the roles of groups of people called hunters, who are aware of the supernatural and fight back against it, but do not necessarily have any special powers, and may not have much knowledge of the monsters they fight. To fight the supernatural, hunters adopt "the vigil", a morality code that gradually erodes their humanity. The monsters the players fight include creatures from other Chronicles of Darkness games, including the protagonists thereof, such as the vampires of the game Vampire: The Requiem or the prometheans of Promethean: The Created. Although the game has a setting with several named organizations and actors, it does unlike the original World of Darkness series not have an ongoing publisher-made narrative.

The game has three types of gameplay: in tier one, the group of hunters – a "cell" – has little support; in tier two, the hunters have the support of a larger organization called a compact; and in tier three, they are at the mercy of large groups called conspiracies, which may control governments. The tier affects the hunters' abilities; additionally, lower tiers give the hunters more freedom whereas higher tiers give access to more resources. Players create their characters in a similar way to other Chronicles of Darkness games, assigning values to different attributes, represented by the filling in of dots on a character sheet. One of these is the willpower attribute, which reflects the hunters' moral conflicts, and can be spent to resist social pressure. Games are led by a storyteller, and outcomes of attempted actions are determined based on characters' statistics and the rolling of dice pools.

Production

Hunter: The Vigil was originally produced by White Wolf Publishing as the sixth game in the Chronicles of Darkness series, which is a reboot of their series World of Darkness. Like many games in the series, it is based on an earlier World of Darkness game – Hunter: The Reckoning (1999) – but it also expands on the basic human characters described in the Chronicles of Darkness rulebook, and takes inspiration from Dark Ages: Inquisitor (2002) and The Hunters Hunted (1992). The first edition of Hunter: The Vigil was developed by Chuck Wendig; although he had written many books for White Wolf Publishing, it was only his second time developing one, which he considered the most difficult aspect of the project for him. He designed it together with Justin Achilli and Rich Thomas; Monica Valentinelli was the lead designer for the second edition.

Wendig described the game's main theme as "light in shadows", with hunter characters fighting against the supernatural as underdogs; a secondary theme to him was the simultaneous fragility and power of humanity, and how the pressure of necessary sacrifices affects the hunters. Valentinelli did not want to drastically change the game for its second edition, but to improve on and clarify the core, including updating the game rules to bring them in line with the other second-edition Chronicles of Darkness games. She also wanted to work with writers of many different backgrounds due to the game's global scope.

Release
White Wolf Publishing announced Hunter: The Vigil in January 2008, and released the first edition on August 14, 2008, at the Gen Con game convention. In the following years, they supported the game with supplementary game books, including several adventure modules. Many of these were created as part of White Wolf Publishing's SAS line ("Storytelling Adventure System") of ebooks, and only released digitally, but the game line has also seen several print releases. The second edition was announced in 2015 by Onyx Path Publishing, a company formed by ex–White Wolf Publishing staff. It was financed through a crowdfunding campaign on Kickstarter, and was released on March 2, 2022.

In addition to the game and the supplementary books, Onyx Path Publishing has released a line of Dark Eras books, which describe the setting of Hunter: The Vigil and other Chronicles of Darkness games during other time periods.

Books

First edition (2008–2017)

Second edition (2022–present)

Reception

Hunter: The Vigil performed better commercially than expected, leading to the initially limited game line getting expanded with further supplementary books, and more of those getting released as printed books. The second edition was also commercially successful, quickly exceeding its crowdfunding goal. The game has also been generally well received critically, with Flames Rising considering the first edition a stand-out among the publisher's games around that time.

Critics liked the gameplay and the ease and speed of creating characters; Fenix found the dot-based attribute system superior to and easier to read than other role-playing games that use number-based systems, and appreciated the willpower rules for encouraging players to take risks for potential rewards. Flames Rising found the tactics rules too complex for a game intended to focus on storytelling, but thought that the game overall worked well both for one-shots and longer campaigns.

The writing saw mixed opinions: Fenix liked the game's "dark and mature" tone, but criticized its portrayal of women, describing it as adhering too strictly to gender roles and mostly portraying women as victims, exemplifying this with how only one of the game's twelve compacts and conspiracies is visually represented by a female character, who they found under-dressed for a hunter. Both Fenix and Flames Rising additionally criticized the writing for at times being choppy; Fenix called it sometimes "pompous" and tedious, something they found unusual for White Wolf Publishing's games. The game's visuals also saw varying responses: Fenix found the quality to be uneven throughout the book, whereas Rue Morgue found the artwork "excellent", and Flames Rising considered the book almost entirely graphically pleasing, with the cover art being one exception.

Notes

References

External links
 

2008 books
Chronicles of Darkness
Kickstarter-funded tabletop games
Role-playing games introduced in 2008
White Wolf Publishing games